Attorney General Abbott may refer to:

Charles Abbott (Australian politician) (1889–1960), Attorney-General of South Australia
Arthur Abbott (1892–1975), Attorney-General of Western Australia
Greg Abbott (born 1957), Attorney General of Texas

See also
General Abbott (disambiguation)